This page presents the same tunnels as in list of tunnels by length in separate lists according to the different tunnel types.

Rail

Under construction

Underground rapid transit

Under construction

Road

Under construction

Water

Under construction

Note: There are buried oil and gas pipelines, up to several thousand kilometers long. See also:
List of oil pipelines
List of natural gas pipelines

Bicycle and pedestrian

Sewerage
 Spotswood sewer tunnel

Power
 London Power Tunnels
 Azabu-Hibiya Common Utility Duct

Gas
 Humber Gas Tunnel

Bored
 Channel Tunnel

Cut-and-cover
 Metropolitan Railway

Mined
 Caltrain San Francisco Downtown extension
 City Rail Link
 Crossrail (Bond Street station)
 (Part of) Küssnacht Southern Bypass
 (Part of) Wanchai Bypass

Drill and blast
 Lötschberg Base Tunnel

Immersed tube
 Conwy Tunnel
 Medway Tunnel

Double-decker or multi-level
 Black Hill tunnels (rail)
 Central Kowloon Route (partly)  (road)
 Great Istanbul Tunnel (rail and road) (proposed; triple-decker)
 Island line - three stretches: between Sheung Wan and Admiralty stations, between Fortress Hill and Admiralty stations, and between Tai Koo and Shau Kei Wan stations (rail)
 Kwun Tong line and Tsuen Wan line between Prince Edward and Yau Ma Tei stations
 Lion Rock Tunnel and Second Lion Rock Tunnel (road, and water and towngas supply)
 LIRR Manhattan Tunnel (rail)
  (road)
 Narodnogo Opolcheniya street tunnel (road)
 State Route 99 tunnel (road)

See also

 List of long railway tunnels in China
 List of long road tunnels in China
 List of longest bridges in the world
 List of longest tunnels
 List of tunnels
 Tunnel

Notes

References

Type
Tunnels, further